Kubanychbek Kasymovich Omuraliev (born 15 September 1960) is a Kyrgyz diplomat and ambassador. He is the Secretary-General of the Organization of Turkic States since 2022.

Education 
Omuraliev graduated from the Kyrgyz National Agrarian University with a degree in mechanical engineering in 1984, and in 1994 he completed the postgraduate studies at the Moscow Institute of Industrial Property with a degree in economics.

Between 1993 and 1996, he followed internships at universities such as the Texas A&M University, the University of Nebraska, the University of Washington and the Seoul National University.

Afterwards, Omuraliev enjoyed diplomatic internships in Belgium, Luxembourg, France, Egypt, and the United States.

From 2003 to 2006, he did an internship on studying the legal and institutional framework for combating corruption in countries such as Singapore, Hong Kong, Norway, Slovenia and Lithuania.

Career 
2019–2022: Ambassador extraordinary and plenipotentiary of the Kyrgyz Republic to the Republic of Turkey.

2021–2022: Ambassador extraordinary and plenipotentiary of the Kyrgyz Republic to the State of Israel with residence in Ankara, Turkey

2016–2019: Ambassador extraordinary and plenipotentiary of the Kyrgyz Republic to the Republics of Estonia, Latvia and Lithuania with residence in Minsk, the Republic of Belarus

2015–2019: Permanent representative of the Kyrgyz Republic to the Commonwealth of Independent States with residence in Minsk, the Republic of Belarus

2015–2019: Ambassador extraordinary and plenipotentiary of the Kyrgyz Republic to the Republic of Belarus

2012–2015: Consul general of the Kyrgyz Republic to the United Arab Emirates

2011–2012: Member of Public Advisory Council, Ministry of Foreign Affairs of the Kyrgyz Republic

2006–2011: Executive director of Kyrgyz Parliamentarians against Corruption (KPAC)

2004–2006: Head of Secretariat to the Consultative Council for Good Governance of the Kyrgyz Republic

2003–2004: Head of Secretariat of the National Council for Good Governance of the Kyrgyz Republic

1999–2003: Minister-counselor, deputy chief of Mission of the Kyrgyz Republic to the USA and Canada

1998–1999: Director, Department of Economic Policy, of Ministry of Foreign Affairs of the Kyrgyz Republic

1997–1998: Deputy director, Department of Western Countries, Ministry of Foreign Affairs of the Kyrgyz Republic 

1992–1997: General director of JSC "KyrgyzAgroImpex", the Foreign Economic Association

1990–1992: Director of the Department of Foreign Economic Relations from the Ministry of Agriculture, Water Resources and Regional Development 

1984–1990: Deputy director of the Agribusiness Company Issyk

Public activities 
Omuraliev was the vice-chair of the Federation of Business Circles of Kyrgyz Republic between 1995 and 1997. He then became a member of the Kyrgyz – American Business Council.

In 2003, he became the national coordinator of the Anti-Corruption Network for Economies in Transition (ACN) and the Organization for  Economic Cooperation and Development (OECD).

Honours 
 Honorary Citizen of City of Houston, Texas, USA (2003)
 Certificate of Honor of the Kyrgyz Republic (2006)
 Anniversary Medal "70 years of the Ministry of Foreign Affairs of the Kyrgyz Republic" (2014)
 The Certificate of Honor of the Commonwealth of Independent States (2017)
 Medal of the "International Club of Chingiz Aitmatov"(2018)
 Anniversary Medal "75 years of the Ministry of Foreign Affairs of the Kyrgyz Republic" (2019)
 Medal of the International Organization of Turkic Culture "Chingiz Aitmatov" (2020)
 Most Successful Ambassador of 2021, Turkey (2022)

Personal life 
Omuraliev is fluent in Kyrgyz, Russian, English and Turkish. He is married and the father of two children.

References 

1960 births
Living people
Kyrgyzstani diplomats
Secretaries-General of the Organization of Turkic States